The National Emergency Stockpile System (NESS) is a federal Government of Canada response to the needs of the health care system in case of an emergency. It is a responsibility of the Public Health Agency of Canada (PHAC).

Synopsis
The NESS is:

The NESS anticipates a pandemic and therefore procures health supplies, such as sanitizers/disinfectants, ventilators and N95 masks. The Federal Budget 2006 allocated $600 million for general pandemic planning and preparedness activities, such as the NESS.

As of May 2020, the NESS was the responsibility of the Vice-President, Health Security Infrastructure Branch at the PHAC. The NESS had fallen on hard times, with a staff of 18 people in normal times, and a budget in 2019 of $3 million. The stockpile was reduced in 2019 from 11 warehouses in nine cities to eight warehouses across six cities.

History
The NESS was established in 1952 when the Cold War was just begun.

Sally Thornton, who was at the time Vice-President, Health Security Infrastructure Branch at the PHAC was quoted in May 2020 to say: "The role has changed to focus more on chemical, biological, radiological and nuclear threats. We began to move away from beds and blankets and increased our holdings of antiviral medications and key treatments." She disclosed that the NESS was not "focused on personal protective equipment and had little of the necessary gear to respond to COVID-19."

See also
 National Antiviral Stockpile
 Strategic National Stockpile

References

Strategic reserves of Canada
Government of Canada
Emergency management in Canada